Anobocaelus is a genus of beetles in the family Biphyllidae, containing the following species:

 Anobocaelus arcanus Grouvelle, 1914
 Anobocaelus championi Sharp, 1902
 Anobocaelus lineatus Grouvelle
 Anobocaelus optatus Sharp, 1902
 Anobocaelus plicicollis Grouvelle
 Anobocaelus simplex Grouvelle

References

Biphyllidae
Cleroidea genera